"Ro Ro Rosey" is a song written by Van Morrison that was written and recorded for Bang Records owner and producer Bert Berns and released on his 1967 album Blowin' Your Mind!.  It was also released as the follow up single to "Brown Eyed Girl."

Writing and recording
"Ro Ro Rosey" was written and recorded for Bang Records owner and producer Bert Berns on 28 March 1967 using the same musicians who recorded "Brown Eyed Girl."

Lyrics and music
The subject of the lyrics of "Ro Ro Rosey" is a 16 year old girl.  Morrison biographer Clinton Heylin believes that this is the same teenage girl who is idealized in other of Morrison's 1960s songs such as "Cyprus Avenue."  In this song, the singer can remember when she was "the apple of [his] eye" but he no longer can see her much as she now lives "way up on the avenue of trees."  When he now does get a chance to see her he becomes tongue-tied, only able to say "oh uh uh uh uh."

The music uses a three chord structure and has a Latin music feel, similar to other songs Morrison recorded for Berns.  Allmusic critic Matthew Greenwald believes that the riff imitates that of Ritchie Valens' hit single "La Bamba."  Morrison biographer Erik Hage describes the song as incorporating "psychedelic fuzz guitar."  Morrison also plays harmonica on the song.

Reception
Billboard described the single as "an infectious folk rocker that should spiral up the charts in short order."  Cash Box said  that it's a "potent, funky foot-stomper" that should be "another winning item" for Morrison after the success of "Brown Eyed Girl." Rolling Stone Magazine critic Dave Marsh described "Ro Ro Rosey" as being "remarkably erotic in the best blues tradition.  On the other hand, Hage describes it as being "an unremarkable rocker brimming with sexual double entendres."  Greenwald describes it as a "fun track" but states that it is obvious that Morrison was already capable of writing better ones.  Music critic Johnny Rogan describes it as an "innocuous rock-blues piece."

The song was released as the follow-up single to Morrison's hit "Brown Eyed Girl."  The b-side of the single was a track that was not included on Blowin' Your Mind called "Chick-A-Boom," which Morrison biographer Clinton Heylin disparaged for silly lyrics such as "I'm going away but I'm coming back/With a ginger cat/What d'ya think of that."  The single version of "Ro Ro Rosey" differed from the album version by overdubbing female singers.  The "Ro Ro Rosey" single did not replicate the chart success of "Brown Eyed Girl."  The song has been re-released on many of Morrison's compilation albums, particularly those documenting his Bang Records recording sessions.

References

1967 songs
Van Morrison songs
Songs written by Van Morrison 
Song recordings produced by Bert Berns
1967 singles
Bang Records singles